Mueang Uthai Thani is the capital district (amphoe mueang) of Uthai Thani province, northern Thailand.

Geography
Neighboring districts are (from the west clockwise) Nong Khayang and Thap Than, of Uthai Thani Province; Krok Phra and Phayuha Khiri of Nakhon Sawan province; Manorom and Wat Sing of Chai Nat province.

Administration
The district is divided into 14 sub-districts (tambons), which are further subdivided into 86 villages (mubans). The town (thesaban mueang) Uthai Thani covers the whole tambon Uthai Mai. There are a further eight tambon administrative organizations (TAO).

References

Mueang Uthai Thani